Shirley D. Love (May 15, 1933 – July 17, 2020) was an American politician and broadcast journalist who served as a member of both chambers of the West Virginia Legislature.

Career 
Love served as a member of the West Virginia House of Delegates, representing the 32nd District from 2017 until 2019. He unsuccessfully ran in the Democratic primary for U.S. House of Representatives in the 2018, losing the 3rd District primary to Richard Ojeda.

He was a member of the West Virginia Senate representing the 11th district from 1994 until 2008. Love was a broadcast journalist, having spent the majority of his career with WOAY-TV in Oak Hill, West Virginia. Love was also a wrestling announcer and host for NWA Saturday Night Wrestling On WOAY-TV.

References

External links
West Virginia Legislature - Senator Shirley Love official government website
Project Vote Smart - Senator Shirley Love (WV) profile
Follow the Money - Shirley Love
2006 2004 2002 Senate campaign contributions

Democratic Party West Virginia state senators
1933 births
2020 deaths
People from Oak Hill, West Virginia
Journalists from West Virginia
21st-century American politicians